The following lists events that happened during 2016 in Somalia.

Incumbents
Hassan Sheikh Mohamud, President, 2012-2017
Omar Abdirashid Ali Sharmarke, Prime Minister, 2014-2017

Events
Somali Civil War (2009–present)
Somalia cut ties with Iran on 7 January following the execution of Shia Sheikh Nimr al-Nimr in Saudi Arabia.
Al Shabaab militants attacked an African Union base in southern Somalia on 15 January
Gunmen attacked the Lido or beach area in Mogadishu on 21 January.

Public holidays

See also

Timeline of Somali history
2016 timeline of the War in Somalia

References

 
Somalia
Years of the 21st century in Somalia
2010s in Somalia
Somalia